Albert Pilát  (November 2, 1903 – May 29, 1974) was a Czech botanist and mycologist. He studied at the Faculty of Science at Charles University, under the guidance of Professor Josef Velenovský. In 1930, he joined the National Museum, eventually becoming head of the Mycological Department, and in 1960 a corresponding member of the academy. He was the author of many popular and scholarly publications in the field of mycology and mountain flora. He also served as the main editor of the scientific journal Czech Mycology, and described several species of fungi. His areas of particular interest include polypores and boletes. He explored the Carpathians looking for fungi and travelled widely. He was also a skilled photographer.
 
In 1934, Josef Velenovský published in Monogr. Discom. Bohem. vol.35 on page 289, a genus of fungi within the Hyaloscyphaceae family, Pilatia which was named in his honour.

In 1936, he wrote with Dr Charles Kavina - 'Atlas des champignons de l'Europe' 

Pilát died suddenly of cardiac failure in 1974.

References

1903 births
1974 deaths
Czech mycologists
Charles University alumni
Czechoslovak botanists